Chris Moukarbel is an American director and producer.  He is best known for his 2017 film Gaga: Five Foot Two, a critically acclaimed documentary about American singer-songwriter Lady Gaga.

His first feature documentary Me at the Zoo premiered in competition at Sundance Film Festival in 2012 and was acquired by HBO Documentaries as part of their summer series. The film charts the rise of YouTube and tells the story of an early viral Internet celebrity, Chris Crocker of “Leave Britney Alone!” fame. Moukarbel was approached by Sheila Nevins to direct the Emmy nominated documentary Banksy Does New York.

He is also the creator and director of the HBO series Sex On // which takes a look at sex and relationships in the Information age. It was conceived as a reboot of the classic show Real Sex. His work often explores technology and identity.

Moukarbel directed and produced the film Gaga: Five Foot Two. It premiered at the 2017 Toronto Film Festival and was acquired by Netflix.

His documentary Wig explores the New York City drag queen scene and the drag festival Wigstock. It premiered at the Tribeca Film Festival on May 4, 2019, and premiered on June 18 on HBO.

Art 

Moukarbel made videos and contemporary art while living in New York. His best known video art project World Trade Center was made as part of his graduate school thesis at Yale School of Art.  Moukarbel acquired a bootleg script for a then upcoming Oliver Stone film World Trade Center and he shot his own version using student actors. The short film was released freely on the internet as a way to pre-empt the Stone film and caused a highly publicized lawsuit by Paramount Pictures.

In a New York Times article about the art project Moukarbel said in the interview "My film was offered free on the Internet… It cost $1,000 to produce. We're at a place now where technology allows the democratization of storytelling." After paramount blocked the distribution of the video it continued to be shown at Witte de With institute of Contemporary art who refused to comply with the court order.

His artwork has shown at Marianne Boesky Gallery, Air de Paris, Witte de with and Wallspace gallery among others.

Music videos 

Moukarbel co-directed the REM music video Everyday is Yours to Win, The Drums, I Felt Stupid and Joan as Police Woman's Start of my Heart.

Accolades

Personal life 

Moukarbel was born in New Haven, Connecticut, to Lebanese parents and lives between Los Angeles and New York. He was in a relationship with Jake Shears, singer of the band Scissor Sisters, from 2004 until 2015.
 
He attended Corcoran School of Art and Yale School of Art.

References

External links 
 
 Banksy Does New York
 The New York Times

Year of birth missing (living people)
Living people
American documentary film directors
American people of Lebanese descent
American gay men
LGBT film directors
LGBT television directors
LGBT film producers
LGBT television producers
21st-century American LGBT people